Live from Austin, TX may refer to:
 Live from Austin, TX (David Byrne album)
 Live from Austin, TX (Neko Case album)
 Live from Austin, TX (Johnny Cash album)
 Live from Austin, TX (Guy Clark album)
 Live from Austin, TX (Drive-By Truckers album)
 Live from Austin, TX (Steve Earle album)
 Live from Austin, TX (Guided by Voices album)
 Live from Austin, TX (John Hiatt album)
 Live from Austin, TX (Waylon Jennings album)
 Live from Austin, TX (Eric Johnson album)
 Live from Austin, TX (Norah Jones DVD)
 Live from Austin, TX (John Mayall album)
 Live from Austin, TX (Tift Merritt DVD)
 Live from Austin (Ian Moore album)
 Live from Austin, TX (Susan Tedeschi album)
 Live from Austin, TX (Richard Thompson album)
 Live from Austin, Texas (Stevie Ray Vaughan video)
 Live from Austin Texas (Widespread Panic album)
 Live in Austin, TX (The Black Keys album)
 Live in Austin, TX (ProjeKct Three album)
 Live from Austin (EP), a 2000 EP by Tara MacLean
 Live from Austin Music Hall, a 2005 album by Chris Tomlin
 Live at Austin City Limits, a 2001 album by Roy Orbison
 Live from Austin, TX (R.E.M. video album), 2010